Linden is an unincorporated community in Atchison County, in the U.S. state of Missouri.

History
Linden was the original county seat of Atchison county. A variant name was Magnet. A post office was established as Linden in 1846, and closed in 1871. The post office was reestablished as Magnet in 1880, and was discontinued in 1900. The present name is for linden trees near the original town site.

References

Unincorporated communities in Atchison County, Missouri
Unincorporated communities in Missouri